The Atlas Vampire was an unknown assailant who committed the unsolved "Vampire Murder" in Stockholm, Sweden. On May 4, 1932, a 32-year-old prostitute, Lilly Lindeström, was found murdered in her small apartment in the Atlas area of Stockholm near Sankt Eriksplan. She had been dead for 2–3 days before police broke into her apartment; she had suffered blunt force trauma to her head. Lilly was found completely naked and face-down on her bed. According to reports, sexual activity had taken place, with a condom found to be protruding from her anus. The detectives noted that a gravy ladle was found at the scene and on further inspection of the body, they realized her body had been drained of all of her blood. Police suspected the implement was used by the perpetrator to drink Lilly's blood. Various clients fell under suspicion but after a lengthy investigation, none were charged with her murder. The murder remains unsolved.

See also
List of unsolved deaths

Notes

References

1930s in Stockholm
1932 murders in Sweden
Crime in Stockholm
Unsolved murders in Sweden
Vampirism (crime)
Unidentified criminals